Sir Henry Milton Taylor  (4 November 1903 – 14 February 1994) was the fourth governor-general of the Bahamas, serving from June 26, 1986 to January 2, 1992.

Biography
Sir Henry, the adopted son of Joseph J. Taylor and Evelyn Taylor, was born on 4 November 1903, at Clarence Town, Long Island. He attended the government school on Long Island and took correspondence courses from London. He taught at public school in Roses, Long Island, from 1924 to 1924; in Pompey Bay, Acklins, from 1925 to 1926; and in Clarence Town, Long Island, from 1933 to 1934.

Career
Taylor became a Member of Parliament in the Parliament of the Bahamas in 1949 when he successfully contested the election for the Long Island and Ragged Island seat.

In November 1953, he co-founded and organized the Progressive Liberal Party (PLP), the country’s first organised political party.

In 1956, Taylor led the first citizen's delegation to London from the Bahamas, accompanied by Lynden Pindling and Milo Butler, to discuss political conditions in the then colony. In 1960, he led another delegation to London to champion the right of women to vote in Bahamian elections. He was accompanied by Dr. Doris Johnson and Eugenia Lockhart. Shortly after their return, the right to vote was extended to woman and exercised for the first time in the 1962 general election.

Between 1968 and 1978, Sir Henry resided in Florida where he began work on his memoirs. At the PLP's silver jubilee convention in November 1978, he was honoured for co-founding the party.  He was appointed by the Bahamas government to the post of editor of the Hansard in February 1979.

Taylor served as Deputy to the Governor-General on several occasions between 1981 and 1986 when the Governor-General, Sir Gerald Cash, was out of the country.

On 25 June 1986, Taylor was appointed Acting Governor-General following Cash’s retirement and sworn in on 26 June.

On 28 February 1991, Taylor was sworn in as Governor-General of the Commonwealth of the Bahamas, becoming the third Bahamian to hold this post. He held the post until his retirement on 1 January 1992.

Awards and recognition
At the PLP's silver jubilee convention in November 1978, Taylor was honoured for co-founding the party. 

Taylor was knighted by the Queen on 23 July 1980, which conferred on him the title of "Sir".

Death and legacy
Sir Henry died on 14 February 1994 at the age of 90.

References

1903 births
1994 deaths
Governors-General of the Bahamas
Knights Bachelor
Members of the House of Assembly of the Bahamas
Progressive Liberal Party politicians
People from Long Island, Bahamas